The 1909–10 season was Manchester United's 18th consecutive season in the Football League and fourth in a row in the First Division.

The club's participation in the Football League seemed uncertain at the start of the season, the Football Association withdrew its recognition of the Association of Football Players’ and Trainers’ Union when the union's intentions were made clear to the FA. Footballers throughout the country relinquished their membership of the AFPTU but the Manchester United team stood up to the FA and refused to give up membership. The club's players, who were dubbed by the press as the "Outcasts FC", continued to strike against the FA until their demands were met but the FA responded by banning those affiliated with the AFPTU. A compromise was reached between the two parties and the suspension was lifted in time for the first game of the season.

In February 1910, the club moved from their old ground at Bank Street to a new home at Old Trafford. The first game played at the new stadium was a First Division fixture against Liverpool on 19 February 1910; the visitors won the match 4–3.

First Division

FA Cup

References

Manchester United F.C. seasons
Manchester United